On the Buses is a 1971 British comedy film directed by Harry Booth and starring Reg Varney and Doris Hare. The film is the first spin-off film from the TV sitcom On the Buses and was followed by two further films, Mutiny on the Buses (1972) and Holiday on the Buses (1973).  The films are set within a slightly different canon from the TV series: Stan and Jack work for a different bus company (Town & District instead of Luxton & District), and the three films form a loose story arc where Arthur and Olive become parents (despite their apparently sexless marriage).

The film was produced by Ronald Chesney and Ronald Wolfe for Hammer Films, and enjoyed major success in Britain, outdoing Diamonds Are Forever to become the highest-grossing film of 1971. The tongue-in-cheek lyrics to the "On The Buses" theme song were written by Roger Ferris, who produced the recording at Abbey Road Studios. Quinceharmon's fine vocal performance secured a release on EMI's Columbia label.

Plot
Stan Butler (Reg Varney), a bus driver for the Town & District bus company, becomes worried that the overtime he is making – which his family is using to buy expensive items such as a washing machine – will soon end when the company rectifies its current lack of employees. His concerns become justified when the company decides to revoke a long-standing rule that prevents women from being employed as bus drivers, much to the chagrin of both Stan and his long-time colleague and friend, Jack (Bob Grant). The loss of overtime that he was making forces Stan to persuade his sister Olive (Anna Karen) to get employment in the company's canteen. Following a disastrous start, she and her husband, Arthur, soon discover that she is pregnant, resulting in her losing her job and forcing the Butler family to send back the items they can't afford to pay for. At the same time, Stan gets into trouble with the company while attempting to recover something of Jack's from a woman he had been seeing, he manages to inadvertently demolish both a telephone kiosk and a bus shelter in trying to avoid being caught by the woman's jealous husband. Despite his efforts to lie about why he caused the damage, Blakey (Stephen Lewis), the bus company's Inspector, takes delight in informing Stan that he has to undertake a driving test on a bus skid pan in order to keep his job. However, Blakey soon regrets supervising the test when Stan gets his own back by beginning the test with Blakey still on the bus being used for it.

Stan manages to pass the test, but he soon becomes worried that the employment of women drivers will affect both his and Jack's layabout lifestyle at the company. It would also reduce their pay and prevent Jack from conducting amorous flings with women on the company's time. The pair decide that the best way to prevent this from happening is to sabotage the company's new employment scheme by making the women drivers look bad, and initially pull off small pranks. Later, when Stan witnesses Olive being terrified of a spider, he and Jack gather some to plant in the cabs of the women's buses, causing further disruption with their driving. These, however, have little effect, until Stan comes up with the idea of lacing their tea with a diuretic, upon learning of what it does when Olive acquires some for her pregnancy. This results in the women drivers being forced to make frequent toilet stops whilst on their routes resulting in multiple delays.

As Olive's pregnancy draws closer to term, Arthur requests Stan's help in fixing the springs on his motorcycle's sidecar to prepare it for the trip to the hospital. While bringing the springs into the depot to get them fixed, amongst a few small things for the new baby, he and Jack discover that the company recently ordered a number of diversion signs to be made to divert buses away from roadworks in the town. Deciding to take advantage of this, the pair arrange for more to be made for their own use, then planting them out on the women's routes; thus causing even more trouble. One such false diversion causes a woman driver to get forced onto a motorway, causing her and Blakey, who was on board, to get in trouble with the police.

A mishap occurs in getting her to the hospital when the bike and sidecar breaks in half, but Olive manages to reach the hospital and give birth to a baby son; but the joyful arrival soon brings disruptions to the Butler household as they struggle to cope with the new child. Meanwhile, Stan and Jack are delighted to learn their sabotage efforts were a success when the company announces its decision to no longer employ women bus drivers. Their celebration however is short-lived, when they learn that Blakey re-hired the women drivers they tormented as inspectors, and they promptly separate the two onto different routes. Although the pair are not happy about this and intend to quit their jobs, Stan soon sees a silver lining to their situation when he is twinned with Sandra (Caroline Dowdeswell) a new attractive female clippie for his route. The story ends with Stan and Sandra managing to cause trouble to Blakey by knocking down a sign onto him and the other inspectors, much to Stan's delight as he heads off to do his route.

Cast
Reg Varney – Stan Butler
Doris Hare – Mum
Michael Robbins – Arthur Rudge
Anna Karen – Olive Rudge
Stephen Lewis – Inspector Cyril 'Blakey' Blake
Bob Grant – Jack Harper
Brian Oulton – Manager
Andria Lawrence – Betty
Pat Ashton – Sally
 Jeanne Varney (daughter of Reg Varney) – Mavis
Pamela Cundell – Ruby
Pat Coombs – Vera
Eunice Black - Ada
Wendy Richard – Housewife
Peter Madden – Mr. Brooks
David Lodge – Fred the Busman
Brenda Gogan – Bridget
Caroline Dowdeswell – Sandra
Nosher Powell – Betty's Husband
Terry Duggan – Nobby
Norman Mitchell – London Transport Official
Claire Davenport – Peggy
Maggie Rennie - Gladys
Tex Fuller - Harry
Anna Michaels - Eileen
Ivor Salter - First Policeman
George Roderick - Second Policeman
Gavin Campbell - Motor Cycle Cop
David Rowlands - Parson
Hilda Barry - Old Woman
Moira Foot - Katy
Reginald Peters - Medical Orderly
Caroline Munro - Poster Girl (uncredited)

Production

Filming
The film was made on location and at Elstree Studios at Borehamwood, Hertfordshire. Stage 5 at Elstree was used for the exteriors of the bus station both in this film and in the later sequels.

The film includes shots of a  London AEC Routemaster RM200 (VLT 200) undergoing the skid tests at the Chiswick Works skidpad.

The buses used in road shots were Eastern National Bristol KSW5Gs numbered 2359 (VNO857), 2367 (VNO862), 2371 (VNO866) and 2376 (WNO476).

Release
The film opened at the ABC Ardwick & Studio 2 cinemas, both in Manchester, on 1 August 1971.

Reception

Box Office
The film was the second most popular movie at the British box office in 1971, and returned more at the UK box office than the year's James Bond film Diamonds Are Forever. By June 1972 it had earned EMI a profit of £106,000. Eventually it earned £1,500,000 in the UK and £1,000,000 overseas, making a profit to Hammer of £532,000. Its box office gross was nearly 28 times its budget.

Critical
Reviewing On the Buses in The Spectator, Christopher Hudson called it "a dullish adaptation of the ITV series".

References

External links

1971 films
1971 comedy films
British comedy films
Buses in fiction
Films shot at EMI-Elstree Studios
Films based on television series
Films shot in London
Hammer Film Productions films
On the Buses
EMI Films films
Films about buses
1970s English-language films
1970s British films